Operation Sledgehammer (2007) was a military search operation during the 2003 Iraq war. The search was carried out in an attempt to disrupt militia influence and violence in the town of Jabella, Iraq 22 June 2007.

Operation details
During the operation eight individuals were detained between the Iraqi Army, the Hillah Special Weapons and Tactics Team, and Coalition Forces.

Military transition team Paratroopers from the 425th Brigade Special Troops Battalion, 4th Brigade Combat Team (Airborne), 25th Infantry Division and Iraqi Security Forces searched the offices of Martyr Sadr and found ten 82mm mortar rounds, ten 102mm mortar rounds, and two improvised explosive devices.

Participating Units

American Units
425th Brigade Special Troops Battalion, 4th Brigade Combat Team (Airborne), 25th Infantry Division

Iraqi Units
The Iraqi Army
the Hillah Special Weapons and Tactics Team

See also

Operation Marne Torch
Operation Arrowhead Ripper

References

 Multi National Force – Iraq

Military operations of the Iraq War in 2007
Iraqi insurgency (2003–2011)